INS Gharial is a Magar-class amphibious warfare vessel of the Indian Navy.

References

Magar-class amphibious warfare vessels
Amphibious warfare vessels of the Indian Navy
Ships built in India
1997 ships